William Emery Barrett (February 9, 1929 – September 20, 2016) was an American Republican politician from Nebraska who served five terms in the United States House of Representatives from 1991 to 2001 as the congressman for Nebraska's third congressional district.

Biography

Barrett was born in Lexington, Nebraska. He attended Hastings College and then earned his license to become a real estate broker.

Before seeking elective office, he served in the United States Navy, was a longtime real estate agent and Republican activist. He had also previously served as an administrator at his college alma mater. Barrett served as a member of the Nebraska Republican State Executive Committee in the 1960s and chaired the Nebraska arm of President Gerald Ford's campaign in 1976.

In 1978, Barrett was elected to the unicameral Nebraska Legislature, where he served until his election to Congress. He was speaker of the legislature from 1987 to 1991 and generated some controversy in that position after heated state budget negotiations.

In 1990, Barrett entered the Republican primary for the 3rd District after eight-term incumbent Virginia D. Smith announced her retirement.  Despite being the highest-profile candidate in the field, he only won the five-way primary by 2,000 votes.  He then faced fellow state senator Sandra Scofield in the general election.  Although Barrett was initially thought to be a prohibitive favorite in this heavily Republican district, the race was extremely close, with Barrett only prevailing by 4,400 votes.  This was the closest a Democrat had come to winning the 3rd since Smith won her first race in 1974 by only 737 votes.  Barrett never faced another contest nearly that close, and was reelected four more times by well over 70 percent of the vote; the Democrats did not field a challenger in 1998.

In Congress, Barrett was a low-key member who generally supported the priorities of Republican leaders. He served on the House Agriculture Committee, helping write the Freedom to Farm Act of 1996 and eventually rising to become vice chairman, as well as the Education and the Workforce Committee. Barrett retired from Congress in 2000 and resided in Lexington. He died on September 20, 2016, at age 87 at an assisted living facility in Lexington.

References

External links

|-

|-

1929 births
2016 deaths
People from Lexington, Nebraska
American Presbyterians
Hastings College alumni
Republican Party Nebraska state senators
Speakers of the Nebraska Legislature
United States Navy sailors
Republican Party members of the United States House of Representatives from Nebraska
20th-century American politicians